The McMillin Bridge (also known as the Puyallup River Bridge) is a concrete half-through truss bridge crossing the Puyallup River, in Pierce County, Washington, built in 1934. 

It was part of State Route 162 until it was replaced by a new span in 2015.

Design
The bridge design uses a hollow-box system, which was suggested to the design company of W. H. Witt Company by Homer M. Hadley. 

The bridge was then built by Dolph Jones. 

The bridge was built to replace a steel span that had been washed out by the flooding river in 1933. 

Because of economic conditions, the concrete design was chosen over a steel design, with a savings of $826, in addition to lower maintenance costs. 

The bridge is unusual in that it combines concrete with the half-through truss design, which was usually built with steel.

Construction
The previous bridge was damaged in 1933, but the replacement bridge was ready to open in 1934, despite the Great Depression.

Historic preservation
The bridge was added to the National Register of Historic Places in 1982. It was saved from demolition after its replacement by a new bridge carrying State Route 162, which opened in 2015.

See also
List of bridges on the National Register of Historic Places in Washington (state)
List of bridges documented by the Historic American Engineering Record in Washington (state)

References

Sources

External links

1934 establishments in Washington (state)
Bridges completed in 1934
Bridges in Pierce County, Washington
Bridges over the Puyallup River
Concrete bridges in the United States
Historic American Engineering Record in Washington (state)
National Register of Historic Places in Pierce County, Washington
Pratt truss bridges in the United States
Puyallup, Washington
Road bridges on the National Register of Historic Places in Washington (state)